The Xiaomi Mi Band 2 is a low cost, wearable activity tracker produced by Xiaomi. It was released on 7 June 2016. Unlike its predecessor, the Xiaomi Mi Band 2 comes with an OLED screen and a capacitive button. In September of 2017, Xiaomi released an ultra low-cost version of the Mi Band 2, titled "Mi Band - HRX Edition"

On 31 May 2018, Xiaomi released the Mi Band 3, the successor to the Mi Band 2.

Specifications

General 
 Brand: Xiaomi 
 Bluetooth version: V4.0 BLE (Chinese version), V4.2 BLE (International version)
 Waterproof Rating: IP67 
 Color: Black
 Compatibility: Android 4.4 + / iOS 7.0 +
 Language: English / Chinese / Multilanguage
 Total length: 235 mm
 Adjustable length: 155–210 mm
 Product size (L x W x H): 40.3 x 15.7 x 10.5 mm
 Product weight: 7.0 g

Sensors 
 Accelerometer
 Optical Heart Rate Monitor
 Vibration Engine

Display 
 Display: 0.42 inch OLED 
 Button: Capacitive

Battery 
 Battery type: Lithium Polymer battery 
 Battery capacity: 70 mAh 
 Battery Life: 10-30 days
 Input current: 45 mA (TYP), 65 mA (MAX)
 Input voltage: DC 5V

Material 
 Front Display Material: Makrolon polycarbonate 
 Case material: TPSiV Thermoplastic copolyester
 Band material: Thermoplastic elastomer
 Band Clasp Material: Plastic

References

External links

 Mi Band 2 – Official website in Chinese
  – Mi International

Sport of athletics equipment
Sports equipment
Xiaomi
Wearable computers
Products introduced in 2016
Activity trackers
Smart bands